Rory Wilson (born 5 January 2006) is a Scottish professional footballer currently playing as a forward for Aston Villa. Wilson has featured for Villa’s U18 and U21 sides since joining the Birmingham club from the Rangers Academy in the summer of 2022.

Club career

Early life & Rangers
Born in Girvan, Wilson joined the academy of Scottish side Rangers at the age of eight. He progressed well through the academy, scoring 49 goals in the 2021–2022 season and being called up to the 'B' team at the age of fifteen. He made one appearance for the B team in the 2021–22 season, in a 2–0 Lowland Football League loss to East Stirlingshire.

Aston Villa
In June 2022, it was reported that English side Aston Villa were interested in signing Wilson. As he was contracted to Rangers until December 2022, the Ibrox club demanded a fee for the transfer. However, Aston Villa claimed that, as Wilson had not signed a professional deal with Rangers, and was only contracted on amateur terms, he was free to sign with them for a low training compensation fee.

Wilson had signed an amateur contract with Rangers in December 2019; a rolling, three-year deal that would've fallen under the jurisdiction of the Scottish FA had he decided to move to a fellow Scottish club. However, as a move to Aston Villa was classified as an international transfer, international governing body FIFA's rules supersede those of national football associations. As the two clubs valuations for Wilson differed, the transfer fee would've been decided by FIFA.

After negotiations between the two clubs resumed, a reported deal worth a minimum of £350,000 was agreed, and Wilson joined Aston Villa in July 2022.

On 6 January 2023, Wilson's 17th birthday, he signed his first professional contract with Aston Villa. Since joining Villa, Wilson’s goal scoring form has continued. For the Villa Academy, Wilson netted hat-tricks against Liverpool and Brentford in the U17 Premier League Cup and FA Youth Cup respectively.

International career
Wilson has represented Scotland at youth international level. In September 2022, Wilson stated he was "shocked" after being called up to the Scotland under-21 side.

Wilson debuted against Wales for the Under-17 side in 2021 and has since represented Scotland Under-17’s in numerous friendly matches, European Championship qualifiers and European Championship finals matches. He has scored more goals than has made appearances for the Under-17s and has since made 2 appearances for the Under-21’s.

Career statistics

Club

Notes

References

External links
 Under-17 profile at the Scottish Football Association
 Under-21 profile at the Scottish Football Association
 Profile at Aston Villa

2006 births
Living people
People from Girvan
Scottish footballers
Scotland youth international footballers
Scotland under-21 international footballers
Association football forwards
Lowland Football League players
Rangers F.C. players
Aston Villa F.C. players